Guatteria atabapensis is a species of plant in the Annonaceae family. It is endemic to Venezuela.

References

atabapensis
Endemic flora of Venezuela
Near threatened flora of South America
Taxonomy articles created by Polbot